W34ED-D, virtual and UHF digital channel 34, was a low-powered television station licensed to Cayey, Puerto Rico, which served the central and southeast region. The station was owned by TV Red Puerto Rico. The station's transmitter was located on PR-52 between Salinas and Cayey.

TV Red Puerto Rico surrendered the license for W34ED-D to the Federal Communications Commission on July 29, 2021, who canceled it the same day.

Digital channel

34ED-D
Low-power television stations in the United States
Television channels and stations established in 2014
2014 establishments in Puerto Rico
Defunct television stations in the United States
Television channels and stations disestablished in 2021
2021 disestablishments in Puerto Rico
34ED-D